Black Eyes or Blackeyes may refer to:
Black Eyes (band), a punk band from Washington, D.C.
 Black Eyes (1936 film), a 1936 film directed by Abdolhossein Sepanta
 Black Eyes (1939 film), a 1939 film directed by Herbert Brenon
 "Black Eyes" (Bradley Cooper song), a 2018 song by Bradley Cooper from A Star Is Born
 "Black Eyes" (Snowden song)
 Colors of the Blind, a 1997 Chinese film sometimes referred to as Black Eyes
 "Dark Eyes" (Russian song) or "Black Eyes", a Russian folk song
 Black Eyes (EP), a 2011 extended play by T-ara
 Blackeyes, a 1987 novel written by Dennis Potter
 Blackeyes (TV series), a 1989 television series based on the above

See also
 Black eye (disambiguation)
 Dark Eye (disambiguation)